Calvary Church may refer to:

 Calvary Church of Santa Ana, California
 Calvary Church, Hillcrest, Delaware
 Calvary Church (Grand Rapids), Michigan
 Calvary Church (Manhattan), New York
 Calvary Church (Charlotte), North Carolina
 Calvary Church (Santo Stefano di Camastra), Sicily

See also
 Calvary (disambiguation)
 Calvary Chapel, a Christian denomination
 Calvary Methodist Church, Boston, Massachusetts
 Calvary United Methodist Church, Philadelphia, Pennsylvania
 Calvary Holiness Church (disambiguation)
 Calvary Baptist Church (disambiguation)
 Calvary Episcopal Church (disambiguation)
 Calvary Lutheran Church and Parsonage (Silverton, Oregon)
 Calvary Presbyterian Church (disambiguation)
 Calvary Memorial Church, Oak Park, Illinois
 Calvary Reformed Church, Kampala, Uganda
 Calvary Christian Church, a multi campus Pentecostal church based in Australia